Eulama Literary Agency (Eulama) is an Italian literary agency which represents a vast array of authors, script writers, as well as a variety of companies and their products.

History
Eulama is the second oldest literary agency in Italy. It was founded in 1962 in Buenos Aires, Argentina, by Harald Kahnemann-Oppenheimer and Karin von Prellwitz, who had emigrated to Argentina from their homes in Germany two decades earlier. The name Eulama is short for European Latin American Agency. The Agency is  now  Europe  based, but  it  still  keeps  a  close  working relationship with the  most authoritative  Latin  American publishers. Since 1964 the head office of the Agency  has  moved  from Montevideo  to  Rome,  from where Eulama operates worldwide, negotiating and licensing literary rights, serializations, permissions, audio, film and co-production rights on behalf of clients all over the  world. Furthermore, Eulama also operates in areas such as monitoring   production-related  activities  of licensees, collecting due payments and researching financial solvency and business history of  potential licensees.

Notable authors mediated by Eulama
 Gabriele Amorth
 Karl Barth
 Leonardo Benevolo
 Norberto Bobbio
 Remo Bodei
 Dietrich Bonhoeffer
 Jane Bowles
 Jerome Bruner
 Peter Burke
 Judith Butler
 Elias Canetti
 Luciano Canfora
 Mário Cláudio
 Carlo Cipolla
 Robert Dahl
 Salvador Dalí
 Umberto Eco
 Hans Magnus Enzensberger
 Federico Fellini
 Paul Feyerabend
 Vilém Flusser
 Dario Fo
 László Földényi
 Bronislaw Geremek
 René Girard
 Nelson Goodman
 Jack Goody
 André Green
 Anselm Grün
 Romano Guardini
 Gustavo Gutiérrez
 Anna Kavan
 Jacques Le Goff
 Aaron J. Gurevitch
 Wolfgang Lepenies
 Rita Levi Montalcini
 Richard Lewontin
 Karl Löwith
 Humberto Maturana
 Johann Baptist Metz
 Jürgen Moltmann
 Massimo Montanari
 Alberto Moravia
 Bruno Munari
 Nuccio Ordine
 Wolfhart Pannenberg
 Ilya Prigogine
 Joseph Ratzinger
 Julien Ries
 Roberto Rossellini
 Paolo Rossi
 Fernando Savater
 Edward Schillebeeckx
 Burrhus H. Skinner
 Karlheinz Stockhausen
 Alain Touraine
 Francisco Varela
 Gianni Vattimo
 Jean-Pierre Vernant
 Michel Vovelle
 Ludwig Wittgenstein

External links
 eulama.com

Literary agencies
Business services companies established in 1962
Argentine companies established in 1962